Walter Story Burr (June 2, 1924 – July 9, 2017), also credited as Wally Burr and Walter Burr, was an American voice actor and director.

As the voice director for The Transformers and The Transformers: The Movie, Burr was known for his perfectionist recording sessions that lasted eight hours. He voice directed several other cartoons during the 1980s, such as G.I. Joe, Jem, Inspector Gadget, and Spider-Man. Burr's vocal performances include The Atom on Super Friends, and Harvey Gabor on Jem, among others.

Burr served in the U.S. Army during World War II as a tank commander and saw action in Normandy. After the war, he was promoted to captain. He had two children.

Filmography

Animation roles
 Crying Freeman - Larry Buck
 G.I. Joe - Captain Lukrov, Dr. Hamler (in "The Pit of Vipers")
 Jem - Harvey Gabor
 Spider-Man - Additional Voices
 The All-New Super Friends Hour - Atom
 The Skatebirds - Additional Voices
 The Transformers - Dancitron Promoter, Jazz (in Kremzeek!), King Nergill, Kremzeek, Ratchet (in "Masquerade"), Seaspray (in his PSA), Thundercracker (in "War Dawn")

Film roles
 Akira - Additional Voices
 Fist of the North Star - Raoh
 Pearl Harbor - Newsreel Voice

Video game roles
 Stonekeep - Big Sharda, Fil Ettin, Nigel Hardstone

Crew work
 Akira (1989 Streamline Dub) - Voice Director (Uncredited)
 Bucky O'Hare - Voice Director
 Captain Caveman and the Teen Angels - Voice Director
 Clue Club - Voice Director
 Conan: The Adventurer - Voice Director
 Dino-Riders - Voice Director
 Dynomutt, Dog Wonder - Voice Director
 Exosquad - Casting Director (Season 1), Voice Director (Season 1)
 G.I. Joe - Voice Director
 G.I. Joe: The Movie - Voice Director
 Godzilla - Voice Director
 Hong Kong Phooey - Voice Director
 Inhumanoids - Voice Director
 Inspector Gadget - Voice Director (Season 1)
 Jem - Voice Director
 The Mumbly Cartoon Show - Voice Director
 My Little Pony Tales - Voice Director, Producer (Song Vocals)
 Rainbow Brite - Voice Director
 Spider-Man - Voice Director
 The Skatebirds - Voice Director
 The Transformers - Voice Director
 The Transformers: The Movie - Voice Director
 Valley of the Dinosaurs - Voice Director
 Visionaries: Knights of the Magical Light - Voice Director
 Wheelie and the Chopper Bunch - Voice Director

References

External links
 The Official Wally Burr Website
 
 
 Wally Burr at Find a Grave

1924 births
2017 deaths
American casting directors
American voice directors
American male voice actors
American television directors
United States Army personnel of World War II
United States Army officers
Tank commanders